Sir Geoffrey Fenton (c. 1539 – 19 October 1608) was an English writer, Privy Councillor, and Principal Secretary of State in Ireland.

Early literary years
Geoffrey (spelt Jeffrey by Lodge) was born in 1539, the son of Henry Fenton of Sturton-le-Steeple,  Nottinghamshire, England and Cicely  Beaumont, daughter of Richard Beaumont of Coleorton Hall, Leicestershire, and was the brother of Edward Fenton the navigator.

Geoffrey is said to have visited Spain and Italy in his youth; possibly he went to Paris in Sir Thomas Hoby's train in 1566, for he was living there in 1567, when he wrote Certaine tragicall discourses written oute of Frenche and Latin. This book is a free translation of François de Belleforest's French rendering of Matteo Bandello's Novelle.

Until 1579 Fenton continued his literary labours, publishing Monophylo in 1572, Golden epistles gathered out of Guevaraes workes as other authors ... 1575, and various religious tracts of strong Protestant tendencies. In 1579 appeared the Historie of Guicciardini, translated out of French by Fenton and dedicated to Queen Elizabeth.

Ireland
Through Lord Burghley he obtained, in 1580, the post of secretary to the new Lord Deputy of Ireland, Lord Grey de Wilton, and thus became a fellow worker with the poet, Edmund Spenser. Fenton thereafter abandoned literature for service to the Crown in Ireland. He proved himself a zealous Protestant, who worked against the "diabolicall secte" of Rome, and urged the assassination of the Crown's most dangerous subjects. He secured the Queen's confidence with his written reports, but was arrested at Dublin in 1587 by the authority of the sitting governor, Sir John Perrot, on account of his debts, and was paraded in chains through the city. He was soon released, and made himself an instrument in Perrot's downfall in the following years.

In 1589 Fenton was knighted, and in 1590–1591 he acted as a Commissioner at London in the controversial impeachment of Perrot, which concluded when a death sentence was passed upon the former governor. By 1603 he was Principal Secretary of State, and Privy Councillor, in Ireland.

The policies Fenton promoted in relation to woodlands in the Plantations encouraged short-term commercial exploitation and clearance for agriculture, giving little weight to their conservation as a strategic resource.

Later life
Fenton is said to have disliked the Scots and in particular James VI of Scotland, so upon James's succession to the English crown as James I of England, Fenton's post was in danger, but Cecil exerted himself in his favour, and in 1604 it was confirmed to him for life, though he had to share it with Sir Richard Coke. Fenton died in 1608, and was buried in St Patrick's Cathedral, Dublin.

Family
Fenton married in June 1585, Alice, daughter of Dr Robert Weston, formerly Lord Chancellor of Ireland by his first wife Alice Jenyngs, and widow of Dr Hugh Brady, bishop of Meath, by whom he had two children — a son, Sir William Fenton, and a daughter, Catherine, who in 1603 married Richard Boyle, 1st Earl of Cork.

The Parsons family of Birr Castle, who hold the title Earl of Rosse, are collateral descendants of Fenton through his sister Catherine, who married James Parsons of Leicestershire.

Notes

References

Attribution:
  Endnotes:
Harl. Soc. publications, vol. iv., Visitation of Nottinghamshire, 1871;
Roy. Hist. MSS. Comm. (particularly Hatfield collection);
Calendar of State papers, Ireland (very full), domestic, Carew papers;
Lismore papers, ed. A. B. Grosart (1886–1888);
Certaine tragicall Discourses, ed. R.L. Douglas (2 vols., 1898), Tudor Translation series, vols. xix., xx. (introd.).

1530s births
1608 deaths
Members of the Privy Council of Ireland
English non-fiction writers
People from Nottinghamshire
People of Elizabethan Ireland
16th-century English writers
16th-century male writers
17th-century English writers
17th-century English male writers
Irish MPs 1585–1586
English male non-fiction writers